Patrick Benjamin Noubissié Youmbi (born 25 June 1983) is a retired  French professional football  player and physiotherapist.

Playing career
Noubissie has played for French sides CS Sedan Ardennes and US Roye Foot Picardie 80 before signing for English teams Crewe Alexandra and Swindon Town.

In August 2007, Noubissie signed a two-year contract with Hibernian. Noubissie was then immediately loaned to Livingston for three months to build up his match fitness. He returned to Easter Road in November 2007 and made a few appearances for Hibs, but he then fell out of favour after manager John Collins resigned.

Noubissie was subsequently loaned out to Dundee on 4 March 2008 as an emergency loan. At the end of the season, Noubissie was released by Hibs.

In July 2009, he trained and played in pre-season friendlies for English Conference National side Kettering Town, with the club's manager Mark Cooper aiming to agree a deal for the midfielder.

In August 2009, he joined Kettering after gaining international clearance from the Cypriot FA. and made his debut in the 1–1 draw against local rivals Oxford United

Physiotherapy career
Due to a long-standing hip injury and multiple surgeries, Patrick was forced to retire from football aged 28 while playing for Kettering Town in the conference at the end of the season 2011/2012.

He trained as a physiotherapist at Coventry University where he graduated with a Bachelor of Science degree in physiotherapy and Master of Science degree in Manual Therapy.

Patrick Firstly took a position as assistant First team physiotherapist at Northamptonshire County Cricket Club assisting Barry Goudriaan, the Head of Sports and Exercise Medicine.

He then moved on to join Leicester City Football Club as an Academy Physiotherapist.

On 1 September 2018, with the appointment of Dutch duo Clarence Seedorf and Patrick Kluivert respectively named Cameroon National Team Head coach and assistant coach, Patrick was appointed as Cameroon National team Physiotherapist.

References

External links
Noubissie expects big things of Poppies

1983 births
Living people
People from Bois-Colombes
Ayia Napa FC players
Crewe Alexandra F.C. players
CS Sedan Ardennes players
Dundee F.C. players
Expatriate footballers in Cyprus
Expatriate footballers in Scotland
Association football midfielders
French expatriate footballers
French footballers
Hibernian F.C. players
Kettering Town F.C. players
Livingston F.C. players
Scottish Football League players
Scottish Premier League players
Cypriot Second Division players
Swindon Town F.C. players
English Football League players
National League (English football) players
French sportspeople of Cameroonian descent
Footballers from Hauts-de-Seine